The Pensacola Barracudas were an American soccer team that played in Pensacola, Florida.

Year-by-year

Defunct soccer clubs in Florida
USISL teams
1998 establishments in Florida
Association football clubs established in 1998
1998 disestablishments in Florida
Soccer clubs in Florida
Association football clubs disestablished in 1998
Sports in Pensacola, Florida